The British Middleweight Championship is the Middleweight professional wrestling championship competed for throughout the British wrestling circuit.

The title was recognised as official by national TV network ITV for the purposes of their coverage of the UK wrestling scene and by its listings magazine TVTimes in accompanying magazine feature coverage.

History

Joint Promotions

Joint Promotions established a British Middleweight title in 1952 in compliance with the resolutions of the Mountevans Committee. By 1971, this title was in the possession of Brian Maxine who continued to claim the title without dispute in an unbroken reign until 2000. Also a successful musician, Maxine wore his championship belt on the cover of record releases.

TWA
A new version of the championship was created in 2000 for TWA which became the focus of a feud between Mal Sanders and James Mason.

Meanwhile, Maxine, wrestling for Premier Promotions, continued to wear his old championship belt but no longer laid claim to the title. A contest for the belt between Maxine and Johnny Kidd on 15 March 2003 in Midhurst was strictly billed as being only for the championship belt as a possession. Maxine would still be wearing the belt for appearances with LDN in 2007.

RBW
A new version of the championship was created out of a four-man tournament which saw "Golden Boy" Cameron Knite qualify over "Sadistic" Jack Storm during December 2003 in Sheffield while Johnny Kidd overcame "The Gift" Ross Jordan in Nottingham during December as well to qualify.

The final was held in Enfield, London on 24 January 2004 and saw Johnny Kidd defeat Knite, two falls to one, to be crowned first champion.

On 22 May 2004 in Hitchin, Hertfordshire, "Misfit" Jorge Castano defeated Johnny Kidd for the Championship, in his third attempt, following previous contests between the two in Chingford and Nottingham, and would hold the belt up to RBW's eventual closer in late 2005. Until and unless steps are taken to reorganise this championship, Castano remains as dormant champion for the rest of his professional career.

List of champions
This is a history of all combined versions of the British Middleweight title.

Key

British independent circuit (1938-1952)

Joint Promotions (1952-?)

The Wrestling Alliance (2000-2003)

RBW (2004-2005)

See also

Professional wrestling in the United Kingdom

References

External links
www.revolutionbritishwrestling.org.uk - Revolution British Wrestling's former official site (no longer active)
1StopWrestling's news and results archive
Wrestling Titles.com website with full history of British Middleweight Championship

Middleweight wrestling championships
National professional wrestling championships
Professional wrestling in the United Kingdom
National championships in the United Kingdom